McBean is a surname.

People with the surname
Notable people with the surname include:
Al McBean (born 1938), retired professional baseball player
Alexander McBean (1854–1937), English businessman, soldier, local Conservative politician, Freemason and Churchman in the Midlands
Angus McBean (1904–1990), Welsh photographer, associated with surrealism
Brett McBean, award-winning Australian horror and speculative fiction writer
Gordon McBean, Canadian climatologist, chairman of the board of trustees of the Canadian Foundation for Climate and Atmospheric Sciences
Jack McBean (born 1994), midfielder in Major League Soccer
James McBean, Scottish footballer
Marnie McBean (born 1968), Canadian rower
Robert McBean, Scottish footballer
Ryan McBean (born 1984), American football defensive tackle
Tracey McBean, fictional character in children's books drawn and written by Mary Small and Arthur Filloy
Wayne McBean (born 1969), retired ice hockey defenceman
William McBean VC (1818–1878), Scottish recipient of the Victoria Cross

Fictional characters
Sylvester McMonkey McBean, "fix-it-up chappie" in Sneetches stories by American author Dr. Seuss
Willy McBean and his Magic Machine (1965), Rankin/Bass full-length stop-motion puppet animated film

See also
McBean (disambiguation)
MacBrayne (disambiguation)
MacBreak
MacBrien
McBain (disambiguation)
McBee
McBrien